Yubo (formerly known as Yellow) is a English social networking app developed by TWELVE APP in 2015. It is designed to "meet new people" and "create a sense of community". The app has 60 million users as of 2022.

History
Yubo was created by Sacha Nigor, Jérémie Coon, and Arthur Paki, when they were engineering students at CentraleSupélec Graduate school of the Paris-Saclay University and Télécom Paris. Formerly known as Yellow, it was first launched in 2015. According to the founders, the app seeks to create a space for "socializing online" and to "facilitate communication between people all over the world who share mutual interests."

In December 2019, the app raised $12.3 million (€11.2 million) in a funding round led by French private equity firms like Iris Capital, Idinvest Partners, Alven, Sweet Capital and Village Global. The funds will be used to develop its technology and expand its global user base.

Between 2015 and December 2019, app users have created an estimated 2 billion friendships, along with exchanging more than 10 billion messages and launching 30 million livestreams.

In 2019, the startup has generated $10 million in revenue.

In 2020, in the context of the COVID-19 pandemic, Yubo recorded a significant rise in use due to quarantined teenagers, with a 550% increase in time spent in video discussion groups. During this period, Yubo doubled the number of new daily signups, which reached 30,000 per day in mid-April. As of October 2020, the app had 40 million users worldwide, 60% of whom are Americans and Canadians.

In September 2020, Yubo established its U.S. headquarters in Jacksonville, Florida. At the same time, Yubo opened a new office in London. In November 2020, Yubo carries out a new fundraising, raising $47.5 million (€40 million) from its historical investors and a new entrant, Gaia Capital Partner. The announced objective is in particular to strengthen moderation and develop the Asian market. In addition, Jerry Murdock, co-founder of Insight Partners who invested in Twitter and Snapchat, joined the board of directors of Yubo.

In November 2021, Yubo opened a second office in the U.S., in New York City.

Features

Core functionalities

Livestreaming 
Live streaming video is the main feature of the app. Each session can host up to ten streamers with an unlimited number of viewers. Streamers can only join a session room if they are invited by another streamer or if they create it. Viewers can send comments to interact with the streamers. Viewers and streamers can become friends. Viewers can choose the live they want to join based on a variety of topics or the nationality of the participants.

The app includes a swiping feature, similar to the dating app Tinder, but for children, to swipe on other people profiles with similar age and messaging features. Users can choose to see only profiles with specific location, or specific gender.
 Unlike many social networks, Yubo does not offer a "like" function on its app, and the app is not based on the  "followers" count .

Snap Camera Inc. 
In December 2020, Yubo through its partnership with Snapchat, the AR lenses from the Snap Inc. camera kit were included directly in the app.

Gender and pronouns 
For Pride Month of 2021, Yubo has added 35 new gender options for users to identify with on the app. The list has been compiled with the UK NGO Mermaids.

Pixels 
In Mid-July 2021, Yubo launched its Pixels collection. This was a collaboration with pixel artist Banfan to create collectible digital art representing qualities, moods and personalities. Yubo users were  purchase these in-app and can start their own collection or send it to their friends.

YuBucks 
In July 2021, Yubo launched its Virtual currency. The application's business model is based on in-app microtransaction system and not advertisements. Available in the Yubo store, YuBucks can be purchased in packs or via a weekly or monthly subscription system. Yubo is based around microtransactions which allow users to, for example, give more visibility to their profile.

Add by tag 
Tags are categories that allows users to share their interests. In November 2021, Yubo launched Add by Tag. Using the feature users can search for people with specific tags to find friends.

Communities
Yubo consists of two communities, one for young people aged 13–17 and an adult community for people aged 18 and over. Members of one community can only interact with other people in their group and cannot communicate with anyone of the opposite community for safety reasons and child protection.

Verified Profiles 
The app uses face-recognition and age-estimation technology on every photo uploaded during sign up. The website app says if a user is under 13 or if an adult has given a wrong age. Moreover, Yubo scans Google to see if user has collected a photo on internet to feed his profile, and every message is scanned in real time to identify problems. Flagged accounts have to download another app named Yoti to get their age verified. Verified users are marked with a yellow badge on their profile.

Controversies

Safety Issues 
Yubo had increased media attention after its app popularized in 2019. It was quickly deemed "Tinder for Teens" by several online resources as Yubo highlights a swiping feature similar to the popular dating app. This feature gave the app an implication of "dating" rather than community or friendship as users would only interact with those they found sexually attractive.

There have been several cases of predatory behavior, grooming, child pornography, and exploitation of minors in relation to the app.

Following these incidents, various measures were taken by Yubo. Yubo entered into a partnership with Yoti in February 2019 to use their age estimation technology to analyze faces and estimate how old users are. The company claims it has already checked more than 22 million profile pictures and removed a "few thousand" profiles belonging to under-13s as a result. Yubo has since placed further safeguards on the app such as a proactive "engage and educate" approach for their community, a mix between AI and human moderators, banning sexually explicit profile content, and auto-blocking fake profiles. However, there is still a possibility for users to create fake profiles containing images of minors as an attempt to hide their true identity.

In 2018, Yubo joined the eSafety Commissioner's Tier 1 social media scheme in Australia for resolving cyberbullying. Australian eSafety Commissioner, Julie Inman Grant, declared: "Altering its age restrictions, improving its real identity policy, setting clear policies around inappropriate content and cyberbullying, and giving users the ability to turn location data off demonstrates that Yubo is taking user safety seriously".

In 2020, Yubo announced a partnership with the National Center for Missing & Exploited Children (NCMEC). Yubo will share data in the event of "suspected illegal activity involving minors". Yubo also implemented an algorithm which scans livestreams. If the algorithm detects inappropriate content in a livestream, the livestream is automatically removed. An independent report on child sexual abuse in the United Kingdom estimates that "the value of human moderation is evident from the success achieved by the social network Yubo, whose moderators interrupt livestreams to tell underage users to put their clothes on".

In February 2021, Yubo launched pop-up alerts in an attempt to prevent inappropriate requests in private chat.  When a user is about to share private information, such as their phone number or location, they receive a pop-up message warning them of the risks of sharing private information.

In July 2021, Yubo was updated with the Muted Words feature. Users can choose any word, abbreviation or emoji that they find offensive to them and contents containing those information would be hidden from the user. Users are also able to choose from whom to mute the words – they can block from all users or just those who are not in their friends. Then the comments with these words will be automatically hidden from the user’s view.

Uvalde School Shooting  
Following the Robb Elementary School shooting on 24 May 2022 in Uvalde, Texas, the app came under criticism for failing to remove the perpetator's profile from their platform quickly, leaving the profile up for four days after the shooting. Multiple witnesses reported that Ramos boasted about purchasing a firearm and posted threatening messages weeks before the tragic event occurred.

References

External links

Mobile social software
Social networking services
Social search
Paris-Saclay
Paris-Saclay University alumni
French social networking websites